Dzandar Zbira or Jack folds (Macedonian Cyrillic: Џандар збира) was a television quiz in North Macedonia hosted by Igor Dzambazov.

See also
Television in North Macedonia

References

External links
 Video of the Shows best bits 1994-1005

Macedonian television series